The Reflecting Skin is a 1990 British-Canadian dramatic horror film written and directed by Philip Ridley and starring Jeremy Cooper, Viggo Mortensen and Lindsay Duncan. Described by its director as a "mythical interpretation" of childhood, the film weaves elements of vampirism, surrealism, black comedy, symbolism, and religious zealotry throughout its narrative about the perceptions and fantasies of an impressionable young boy in 1950s America. The Reflecting Skin places the majority of its action outdoors around the dilapidated farms and in the wheat fields of Idaho shot in idyllic sunlight which belies the dark secrets of the characters and plot.

Plot
Eight-year-old Seth Dove lives in an isolated American prairie community in the 1950s. The film opens with Seth and his friends, Eben and Kim, playing with a frog Seth has found in the fields. The boys inflate the frog by inserting a reed up its anus and leave it by the side of the road. When a local English widow, Dolphin Blue, stops to inspect it, Seth shoots the inflated frog with a slingshot, causing it to explode over Dolphin.

Seth retreats back to the small gas station where he lives with his overworked, harsh, longing mother Ruth and shy, closeted, detached father Luke. Seth's older brother, Cameron, is away on military service in the Pacific (Ruth refers to them as "the pretty islands"). Seth serves gas to a mysterious group of young men driving a black Cadillac, who promise to see him again soon and drive off.

Seth is sent to Dolphin's house to apologise for the frog prank. Dolphin is haunted by the memory of her dead husband, who hanged himself for unknown reasons a week after their wedding.  Surrounded by artifacts from her husband's family's whaling past, Seth takes some of her self-pitying remarks (she claims to be "two hundred years old") literally. After having just learned about vampires from his father, Seth begins to believe that Dolphin must be a vampire.

After Eben goes missing, Seth and Kim go to Dolphin's house to investigate, because Seth believes she is responsible for Eben's disappearance. They go up to Dolphin's bedroom and demolish her belongings. They later hear Dolphin downstairs. The boys proceed to spy on her as she sits on a chair, moaning and touching herself. After getting caught, the boys scream and run outside. Seth sees the same black Cadillac from before, after which he runs home and later finds Eben's dead body floating in the water cistern. The local authorities believe that Seth's father, Luke, is responsible, because of a homosexual indiscretion years previously; believing himself to be doomed, Luke douses himself with gasoline and incinerates himself.

Cameron returns home to look after his brother Seth, as Ruth has become shell-shocked following her husband's self-immolation. Whilst visiting his grave, Cameron meets Dolphin, and romance sparks between the two, much to Seth's horror. In a nearby barn, Seth and Kim discover an ossified dead fetus, which Seth takes home with him, believing it to be Eben incarnate as a fallen angel. Cameron shows Seth a photograph of a baby dying from radiation poisoning, which both fascinates and disturbs Seth. The next day, Seth follows Cameron to Dolphin's house, where he observes Cameron emotionally confessing to Dolphin his culpability in atomic bomb experiments. Cameron and Dolphin begin to make love; running in terror from the house, Seth witnesses the men in the Cadillac abducting Kim.

Cameron's body begins to deteriorate from radiation sickness, which Seth attributes to Dolphin's supposed vampirism. Kim's body is discovered the next day, and law enforcement authorities still believe that Luke is alive and responsible. As Cameron and Dolphin grow closer and plot to run away together, Seth focuses his rage at Dolphin. He consults with the fetus "angel Eben" that night on how to deal with her. On the spur of the moment the next day, as she is about to get a ride from them, he does not warn Dolphin of the men in the black Cadillac. Dolphin's body is found, and Cameron breaks down in front of Seth. Realizing he has effectively broken his brother, Seth runs to a nearby field and, overwhelmed with anger, screams at the setting sun.

Cast

 Jeremy Cooper as Seth Dove
 Viggo Mortensen as Cameron Dove
 Lindsay Duncan as Dolphin Blue
 Sheila Moore as Ruth Dove
 Duncan Fraser as Luke Dove
 David Longworth as Joshua
 Robert Koons as Sheriff Ticker
 David Bloom as Deputy
 Evan Hall as Kim
 Codie Lucas Wilbee as Eben
 Sherry Bie as Cassie
 Jason Wolfe as Cadillac Driver
 Dean Hass as Passenger
 Guy Buller as Passenger
 Jason Brownlow as Passenger
 Jeff Walker as Adam Blue
 Joyce Robbins as Twin
 Jacqueline Robbins as Twin
 Debi Greenawdt as First Woman
 Sandra Redmond as Second Woman
 Walt Healy as Old Man

Production
Philip Ridley was inspired to write the screenplay for The Reflecting Skin after completing a sequence of artworks titled American Gothic whilst studying at St Martin's School of Art.  "I read a lot of American literature when I was a child growing up and saw a lot of American films so what I did, particularly in The Reflecting Skin, is that I created a fabulous child-eyed view of what I imagined America to be like – it's a kind of mythical once upon a time never-world, where guys look like Marlon Brando and Elvis Presley, and everything is set in a Wheatfield and it all looks very American gothic." Upon directing two short films (Visiting Mr. Beak and The Universe of Dermot Finn) and completing the screenplay for The Krays (directed by Peter Medak), Ridley received $1.5 million of funding from the BBC, British Screen and Zenith Productions to shoot The Reflecting Skin in Crossfield, Alberta, Canada.

In collaboration with director of photography Dick Pope, Ridley channelled his artistic influences (including Andrew Wyeth and Edward Hopper) to create a hyper-realised vision of a "mythical, hallucinogenic summer in the life of a child." This extended to Ridley personally spray-painting the wheatfields a brighter shade of yellow, and shooting exterior scenes at 'magic hour', "when the sun was at its most intense and golden." The film also features Viggo Mortensen in one of his first starring roles.

Critical reception
The Reflecting Skin premiered at the Cannes Film Festival in 1990, where the critics declared it "déjà un culte"  ("already a cult") before they had even left the auditorium. The word of mouth about the film, particularly the notorious "exploding frog" opening, was so intense that extra screenings had to be scheduled in order to cater to demand. It went on to win 11 international awards at other film festivals and was picked up for distribution in the US by the then-fledgling Miramax.

Although some critics were outraged by the film's "abnormal situations and morbid characters", among the more prominent admirers of The Reflecting Skin was Roger Ebert, who said it "reminded me of Blue Velvet and the other works of David Lynch, but I think it's better… it's not really about America at all, it's about nightmares, and I'm not easily going to forget it." Writing for Rolling Stone, Peter Travers wrote that "Ridley is a visionary, and his haunting film, luminously shot by Dick Pope, exerts a hypnotic pull." Kevin Thomas of the Los Angeles Times called it "an amazing film, studded with selfless, luminous performances and shot through with dark humor, that risks sheer over-the-top outrageousness at every turn but is so simultaneously inspired and controlled that it gets away with everything."

The Reflecting Skin has been reappraised in recent years as "one of the essential art film/horror hybrids from the past few decades." Reviewing the 2015 restoration for Twitchfilm, Jason Gorber described it as a "strange, at times wonderful film, one that leaves more questions open than answers. Its palate and performances collide in ways that seem unique decades on." Writing for The Guardian, Rowan Righelato described it as "stunningly beautiful… a gothic masterpiece that is often strangely overlooked." Reviewing the special edition Blu-ray on BBC News, Mark Kermode said "Philip Ridley is an extraordinary filmmaker... A really strange, interesting, disturbing, weird piece of work that has found its audience over the years. That's what a proper cult film looks like."

Awards
At the 1990 Locarno International Film Festival, Ridley won three awards, C.I.C.A.E. Award, the FIPRESCI Prize, and Silver Leopard. At the 1990 Sitges – Catalan International Film Festival, Lindsay Duncan won the Best Actress award and Dick Pope the award for Best Cinematography. At the 1990 Stockholm Film Festival, Ridley received the FIPRESCI Prize.

Home media
The Reflecting Skin was unavailable on home video for many years following its initial VHS release in the UK or USA.

A widescreen DVD was released in Japan in 2005, but quickly went out of print, leaving only a poor-quality German Blu-ray and a fullframe American DVD release from Echo Bridge Entertainment as the only available releases for several years.

In 2015, UK distributor Soda Pictures announced a release of the film in a limited Blu-ray Steelbook edition on 30 November 2015, featuring a new director-approved HD remaster, director's commentary, two new documentaries, Philip Ridley's early short films (Visiting Mr. Beak and The Universe of Dermot Finn), and a personally signed art card of his painting Fetal Blossom, which was one of the artworks that inspired the film. The distributor later released a standard edition Blu-ray and DVD of the film on 14 March 2016, containing all the features of the limited edition except for the signed art card or steelbook packaging.

In 2016, the Ridley's approved remaster of the film was released on BFI Player, where it was made available for online streaming.

In 2019 Soda Pictures released the movie on Blu-ray and DVD in the US and Canada in a widescreen version.

In 2020, The Criterion Channel added the film on the streaming service as part of the double feature "Against the Grain" with 1978's Days of Heaven. Both films were described as "Magic hour meets black magic" and as "two visually stunning slices of Americana set amid rippling wheat fields and bathed in sunset’s golden glow."

Derivative works
Elements of the film have been referenced and used in a number of other artistic works, particularly in music.
 
The cult British band Coil used dialogue excerpts from the film on the track Omlagus Garfungiloops on their 1992 album Stolen & Contaminated Songs.
The Scottish band River Head used a still from the film on the cover of their 1992 single sided 7" EP Was Away / Haddit.
The Canadian musician Phil Western used dialogue excerpts from the film in his 1998 Album The Escapist.
The industrial/noise rock duo Uniform used a dialogue excerpt from the film on the track The Light at the End (Effect) on their 2017 LP Wake in Fright.

See also
 Dandelion Wine
 Andrew Wyeth
 Tideland (film)

References

Bibliography

External links
 
 
 

1990 films
1990 horror films
1990 independent films
1990s thriller films
British independent films
Canadian independent films
Canadian horror thriller films
British horror thriller films
English-language Canadian films
Film noir
1990s English-language films
Films directed by Philip Ridley
1990s Canadian films
1990s British films